The first season of the Malayalam-language version of Indian reality television series Bigg Boss was telecast on Asianet from 24 June 2018 to 30 September 2018, lasting 99 episodes. It was produced by Endemol Shine India and actor Mohanlal was the host of the show. The show follows a total of 18 contestants, who are isolated from the outside world for 98 days (or 14 weeks) in a custom built house. Each week, one or more of the housemates are evicted by a public vote.

For the first season, a splendid home had been set up in Film City, Mumbai. The winner was awarded a prize worth . The show is being aired on Asianet channel and is also available on VOD and OTT platform Hotstar. Some new elements called 'Unseen', 'Spicy specials' and 'Bigg Boss Plus' was introduced by way of unseen and extra footage's uploaded on Hotstar. Bigg Boss Plus is aired on Asianet Plus and shows part of the day that weren't included in the episode, from 'wake-up call' to 'lights out'.

The show aired its grand finale on 30 September 2018, declaring Sabumon Abdusamad as the winner of the first season, while Pearle Maaney was the runner-up. The other finalists were Shiyas Kareem, Srinish Aravind and V. Suresh Thampanoor (in finishing order).

Housemates status

Housemates
The participants in the order of appearance and entrance in the house are:

Original entrants
 Shweta Menon, Film Actress
 Deepan Murali, TV Actor
Sreelakshmi Sreekumar, Film Actress
Srinish Aravind, TV Actor
Hima Shankar, Film Actress
Aristo Suresh, Singer, Film Actor
Diya Sana, Social Activist
Anoop Chandran, Film Actor
Aditi Rai, Film Actress
Basheer Bashi, Internet Celebrity
Manoj K. Verma, Businessman
Pearle Maaney, TV Host
David John, Model
Sabumon Abdusamad, Film Actor
Archana Suseelan, TV Actress
Ranjini Haridas, TV Host

Wildcard entrants
Shiyas Kareem, Model
Anjali Ameer, Film Actress

Guests

Episodes

Weekly summary
The main events in the house are summarized in the table below. A typical week begins with nominations, followed by the luxury budget task, punishment than a task for immunity or anything else and then the eviction of a housemate during the Sunday or Saturday. Evictions, tasks, and other notable events for a particular week are noted in order of sequence.

Nominations table

Notes
  indicates the House Captain.
  indicates the housemate was directly nominated for eviction prior to the regular nominations process.
  indicates the housemate was granted immunity from nominations.
  indicates the winner.
  indicates the first runner up.
  indicates the second runner up.
  indicates the third runner up.
  indicates the fourth runner up.

 : Manoj left the show due to his poor health conditions.
 : The house captain was asked to nominate 7 out of all the contestants to be in the nomination list in which the co-housemates could select two for this week's nomination. Captain chose Anoop, Hima, Deepan, Diya, Pearle, Srinish and Suresh.
 : Pearle and Suresh were safe and Anoop was about to evict but Shweta's decision to forgive him for confronting her in the captaincy task made him safe from eviction. Hence, No housemate evicted on Week 2.
 : As a new housemate, Shiyas was exempted from the eviction and nomination procedures.
 : Housemates mutually decided Aditi, Deepan, Pearle, Sreelakshmi, Shiyas and Srinish to be in the nomination list. Later, each housemate chose two among these to be nominated. Finally, Aditi, Deepan, Sreelakshmi, and Srinish got nominated for eviction.
 : After Sreelakshmi's eviction on day 27, Deepan was evicted on day 28. For the first time, two housemates were evicted from the house in the same week.
 : Housemates were assembled in the activity area. They individually asked to paint the face and shared the opinion about their nominations. Ranjini and Shweta were nominated for eviction with seven and ten votes respectively and on day 35, Shweta evicted from the show after facing the public votes.
 : As a new housemate, Anjali was exempted from being nominated but she was allowed to nominate two housemates.
 : Archana saved herself from eviction by winning the captaincy task.
 : Aditi and Anjali could not end up in a decision about their nomination. Both the housemates were not ready to be nominated for eviction.
 : Bigg Boss ordered Archana to choose one between Anjali and Aditi for the eviction. Archana chose Aditi saying that Anjali has recently come to the house.
 : On Day 44, Anjali was taken to the hospital after becoming ill and on Day 45, she left the show due to her poor health conditions.
 : Aditi received fewer votes and was technically evicted from the show but Anjali Ameer called and asked Mohanlal that nobody should be evicted from the house. She said that she loves Aditi a lot. She requested Mohanlal to avoid the eviction at any cost. Upon Anjali's request, the eviction was canceled.
 : On Day 49, ex-contestant Hima Shankar re-entered the house as a wildcard.
 : Hima was exempted from being nominated but she was allowed to nominate two housemates.
 : Keralites were not able to vote in the poll due to heavy rain and flood. Mohanlal revealed that the same nominees will be there in the eviction list on next week too.
 : On day 63, by winning a task, Ranjini achieved immune to be safe in the next nominations but later, she was evicted on the same day after facing the public votes and passed on her immune power to Archana.
 : On day 63, by winning a task, Sabumon achieved a special power to save a nominated housemate. He saved Hima from the nominations.
 : The nomination procedure was based on a task. Housemates had a balloon tied up to their feet and each should safeguard it from others. Housemates, who fail to save the balloon were nominated for eviction.
 : The housemates were asked to pierce knife into the heart shape over the photos of two contestants, whom they think doesn't deserve to be in the finale. Archana, Pearle, Sabumon and Srinsh were voted the most. Later, the captain Aditi was given her special power to nominate any housemates directly. She nominated Basheer and Suresh. Hence Archana, Basheer, Pearle, Sabumon, Srinsh and Suresh are nominated for the eviction.
 : Since Suresh never became a house captain till week 12, he was appointed as the house captain for one day (Monday, the day of nomination). But the housemates were allowed to nominate the captain for eviction.
 : On Day 95, Bigg Boss ordered everyone to assemble in the garden area announced that there will be a mid-week elimination. Aditi Rai evicted from the house for receiving the fewest votes to win Bigg Boss.

Ratings and viewership
Official ratings are taken from BARC India.

References

External links
 Official Website on Hotstar

Asianet (TV channel) original programming
Malayalam-language television shows